How Would You Like to Be the Ice Man? is an 1899 American comedy film.

External links
 

American silent short films
1899 comedy films
1890s American films
Silent American comedy films
1890s English-language films
1899 films
American comedy short films
American black-and-white films
1899 short films